Jens Georg Spahn (born 16 May 1980) is a German politician who served as Federal Minister of Health in the fourth cabinet of Chancellor Angela Merkel from 2018 to 2021. A member of the centre-right Christian Democratic Union (CDU), he has been the member of the lower house of the federal parliament, the Bundestag (MdB), for Steinfurt I – Borken I since 2002.

At the time of his election in 2002, Spahn – at age 22 – was the youngest member of the CDU in the German parliament. He has since then served in the 15th, 16th, 17th, 18th, 19th and currently in the 20th Bundestags and is one of the main sponsors of pension reform in Germany. He was a member of the Committee of Health of the 17th Bundestag and the CDU/CSU parliamentary group's spokesperson on health. He served as Minister of Health during the COVID-19 pandemic in Germany.

When Chancellor Angela Merkel stated her intention not to seek re-election for the CDU party leadership in 2018, Spahn announced his intention to stand for election as her successor in December 2018. He was eliminated in the first round of voting; the position instead went to Annegret Kramp-Karrenbauer. Following Kramp-Karrenbauer's decision to resign in February 2020, he announced that he would not run for the party's leadership but instead endorse candidate Armin Laschet. His alliance with Laschet proved successful, as his ally became CDU party leader on 16 January 2021 and candidate for chancellor of the CDU/CSU party alliance on 19 April 2021.

Early life and career 
Spahn was born on 16 May 1980 in Ahaus, North Rhine-Westphalia. He grew up with his two younger siblings in the village of Ottenstein in the north of Westmünsterland. Spahn graduated in 1999 from the Episcopal Canisius school in Ahaus. In 2001 he completed an apprenticeship as a banker at the Westdeutsche Landesbank, and worked until 2002 as a bank clerk. In 2003, Spahn began studying political science and law at the University of Hagen. In 2008, he obtained a bachelor's degree, followed by a master's degree in the same field in 2017.

Political career

Party positions 
Spahn became a member of the Junge Union Deutschlands (JU) in 1995, aged 15. He went on to join the CDU in 1997. He was the chair of the Borken district JU from 1999 to 2006. In 2005, he also took up the chair of the Borken district CDU, which numbers 6,500 members.

In December 2014 Spahn unexpectedly stood for a place on the CDU's ruling council against health minister Hermann Gröhe, in a contest widely seen as crystallizing the generational tensions within the party. His election bid was backed by the then 72-year-old finance minister, Wolfgang Schäuble. Shortly before the vote at the annual CDU party conference, Gröhe withdrew his candidacy and Spahn was elected.

He has been mentioned as a possible replacement for Angela Merkel as Chancellor, and stood in the CDU leadership campaign in 2018 after Merkel announced that she would not seek re-election as party leader. However, the 157 votes he secured, despite being more than expected, was insufficient for him to qualify for the second round of voting, which was won by Annegret Kramp-Karrenbauer.

Member of Parliament, 1999–present
Spahn has been a member of the Ahaus City Council since 1999.

Spahn first became a member of parliament in the 2002 elections. He has since won three consecutive elections in 2002, 2005 and 2009 in the constituency of Steinfurt I – Borken I. In 2005, he obtained 51.2% of first preference votes. In the 27 September 2009 election, Spahn won again with 44.5% of the primary vote, earning a direct mandate.

From November 2005, Spahn served as the vice-chair of the CDU/CSU working group on health policy, while at the same time chair of the CDU–CSU parliamentary group in the Committee of Health. He was also a member of the CDU–CSU–SPD coalition working group, which brought about the 2007 health reform. Since 2009, he has been chair of the working group on health and health policy as well as the spokesman of the CDU–CSU parliamentary group on health policy.

Spahn was a substitute member of the Budget Committee. He is part of the "Young Group" of the CDU–CSU parliamentary group. Spahn co-founded a cross-party group of young MPs pushing for the integration of intergeneration equity as a national objective into Germany's Basic Law.

Between 2005 and 2013, Spahn served as deputy chair of the German–Dutch Parliamentary Friendship Group. Since 2014, he has been its chair.

In negotiations to form a government following the 2013 federal elections, Spahn led the CDU–CSU delegation in the health working group; his co-chair from the SPD was Karl Lauterbach.

Parliamentary state secretary in the Federal Ministry of Finance, 2015–2018
In 2015, Spahn became Parliamentary State Secretary in the Federal Ministry of Finance under minister Wolfgang Schäuble in the third cabinet of Chancellor Angela Merkel. At the ministry, he oversaw the German government's annual budget. He was in charge of representing Germany in the negotiations on the annual budget of the European Union.

Federal Minister of Health, 2018–2021
In the fourth Merkel cabinet, Spahn was appointed Federal Minister of Health in March 2018, succeeding Hermann Gröhe. In addition, he chaired the EPP Health Ministers Meeting, which gathers the center-right EPP ministers ahead of meetings of the Employment, Social Policy, Health and Consumer Affairs Council (EPSCO). When Germany held the rotating Presidency of the Council of the European Union in 2020, he chaired the meetings of EPSCO.

 Global health 
In 2019, Spahn visited four countries in sub-Saharan Africa to witness up close the fight against Ebola. Alongside Armin Laschet, he was invited by President Emmanuel Macron of France to attend the 2020 Bastille Day celebrations in Paris, in a sign of gratitude for their role in helping French citizens during the COVID-19 pandemic in France. As a representative of the German government, he was later part of the delegation accompanying Macron on his state visit to South Africa in May 2021.

 Covid-19 pandemic 
On 20 October 2020, Spahn stated on morning TV: ‘At least we know what the main causes of [COVID-19] infection are. Parties, social occasions, at home and in private or at events, when going to clubs.’ Der Spiegel magazine later revealed that, on the very same evening, Spahn met around a dozen CDU party donors for a business dinner at an associate's house. According to the German news channel ntv, each guest was asked to donate €10,000 (£8,600) to take part. Spahn developed symptoms and tested positive the next day, which suggests he was infectious while attending the party.

In March 2021, the "Burda mask deal" caused a major political storm when it was revealed that the Burda company had delivered half a million medical masks to the Spahn-led Federal Ministry of Health for $4.50 each, without the Ministry having first put the deal out to open tender. Burda, of which Spahn's husband, Daniel Funke, was the former editor-in-chief and lobbyist at the time of the deal, reportedly procured the protective masks for $1.73 each through a Singapore company. According to polls, the CDU/CSU coalition's popularity fell from 35 percent to 27 percent following the "Burda mask deal".

Deputy Chair of CDU/CSU Group, 2021–present
Since December 2021, Spahn has been serving as one his parliamentary group's deputy chairs, under the leadership of chairman Ralph Brinkhaus. In this capacity, he oversees the group’s legislative activities on economic affairs and climate protection.

In the negotiations to form a coalition government of the CDU and Green Party under Minister-President of North Rhine-Westphalia Hendrik Wüst following the 2022 state elections, Spahn led his party's delegation in the working group on economic affairs, energy and climate protection; his co-chair from the Green Party was Mona Neubaur.

Political positions

Human rights
An economic liberal and openly gay Roman Catholic, Spahn has combined a platform of lower taxes and less red tape with support for same-sex marriage. In 2012, he and twelve other CDU/CSU MPs united in their call for defending tax-law equality for couples registered in a civil union. In a public vote in June 2012, he pushed for such legislation as well as to open marriage to same-sex partners, but the bill was denied by his own party and eventually defeated. By 2013, Spahn and others considered signing on to a "group petition," in which they would publicly side with the opposition on expanding the rights of registered same-sex partnerships to include all the tax benefits given to married heterosexual couples. As health minister, he introduced a law in 2019 to ban conversion therapy on under-18s, or coercing, deceiving or threatening anyone older into such treatment. Violators can be punished by up to a year in prison, while advertising or offering conversion therapy carry a fine of up to 30,000 euros.

During the European migrant crisis, Spahn emerged as a vocal critic of Chancellor Angela Merkel's refugee policy, arguing that their party had "perhaps put too much emphasis on the humanitarian approach".

Pension policy
In April 2008, Spahn voiced his opposition to grand coalition plans to increase pensions because such a "gift" to the "medium and long-term retirees" would cost a "lot of money". He particularly criticized the arbitrary intervention of federal labour minister Olaf Scholz in the form of a surprise announcement on pensions formula.

This statement brought him strong criticism, especially from the Senior Citizens Union (Senioren-Union). Spahn received many insults and threats in the form of anonymous letters, inter alia, and complained of this in the media. The Senior Citizens Union announced it would do everything to prevent his re-election, but Spahn received the support of former president of Germany Roman Herzog.

After the 2013 federal elections, Spahn criticized the coalition pact between CDU/CSU and the SPD for making too many concessions to the SPD on lowering the retirement age from 67 to 63 for some workers.

In November 2018, Spahn called for Childless Tax where Childless people should be paying much more towards care and pension insurance than those who have started a family.

Health policy
As part of coalition negotiations, Spahn and others succeeded in bringing "core demands for a black and yellow health policy" against the opinion of some like Rolf Koschorrek, in the form of a rearrangement of the Institute for Quality and Efficiency in Health Care (IQWiG). In order to do so, they asked for a "realignment at the top of the house staff". This is because the coalition agreement says that "the work of the IGWiG is checked" and "its decisions are respected". This came at a time when Peter Sawicki, the institute's director, had repeatedly voiced his opposition to the introduction of new medicine. Journalist Markus Grill wrote about "Operation Hippocrates", an alleged plot to replace Sawicki with a more pharmaceutical industry-friendly candidate.

During his time in office, the German government introduced measure to make measles vaccinations mandatory for children and employees of kindergartens and schools.

Foreign policy
In 2021, Spahn publicly called for Germany to reduce its over-reliance on China in many areas and to do more to diversify its export markets by sealing and finalising more trade deals with other countries and regions such as Canada.

Other activities

Corporate boards
 Sparkasse Westmünsterland, member of the supervisory board (2009–2015)
 Mosaiques Diagnostics und Therapeutics AG, member of the supervisory board (2010–2012)
 Signal Iduna Pensionskasse AG, member of the supervisory board (2005–2010)
 Barmenia Insurances, member of the advisory board (2005–2008)

Non-profit organizations
 German Forum for Crime Prevention (DFK), ex-officio member of the board of trustees (2018–2021)
 World Economic Forum (WEF), member of the Europe Policy Group (since 2017)
 Deutsche AIDS-Stiftung, member of the board of trustees
 Jugend gegen AIDS, member of the advisory board
 Konrad Adenauer Foundation (KAS), member
 FernUniversität Hagen, member of the Parliamentary Advisory Board 
 Magnus Hirschfeld Foundation, Member of the board of trustees
 Federal Cultural Foundation, member of the board of trustees
 Atlantik-Brücke, member
 Catholic Workers Movement (KAB), member
 Humanitarian Aid Foundation for Persons infected with HIV through blood products (HIV Foundation), chairman of the board (since 2018)
 German Federal Environmental Foundation (DBU), member of the board of trustees (2015–2018)

Corruption allegations
When Der Spiegel investigated corruption claims over Spahn's financial activities — involving property he had acquired privately as well as deals he had made with PPE suppliers as health minister — Spahn demanded journalists’ names and attempted in court cases to prevent the media from publishing exact figures and details.

Personal life
Spahn is a self-described Roman Catholic although he has problems with the Catholic Church and its sexual morality. He lives with his husband Daniel Funke, a German journalist and lobbyist, in Berlin's Schöneberg district. In December 2017, the two married in a civil ceremony at Borbeck Palace in Essen, officiated by the city's mayor Thomas Kufen. In an article of Süddeutsche Zeitung in July 2012, his homosexuality was mentioned for the first time. He is an honorary member of FC Bayern Munich.

Publications
 Jens Spahn, Olaf Köhne, Peter Käfferlein: Wir werden einander viel verzeihen müssen: Wie die Pandemie uns verändert hat – und was sie uns für die Zukunft lehrt. Innenansichten einer Krise. Heyne September 2022, .

References

External links

 
Official Bundestag biography 
Lebenslauf bei der CDU/CSU-Bundestagsfraktion 
Jens Spahn at Abgeordnetenwatch 

1980 births
Gay politicians
German Roman Catholics
LGBT conservatism
LGBT members of the Bundestag
LGBT Roman Catholics
Living people
Members of the Bundestag for North Rhine-Westphalia
People from Ahaus
University of Hagen alumni
German LGBT politicians
Members of the Bundestag 2017–2021
Health ministers of Germany
Members of the Bundestag 2021–2025
Members of the Bundestag 2013–2017
Members of the Bundestag 2009–2013
Members of the Bundestag 2005–2009
Members of the Bundestag 2002–2005
Members of the Bundestag for the Christian Democratic Union of Germany